This is a comprehensive list of major music awards and nominations received by Foo Fighters, an American alternative rock band. Foo Fighters were formed in 1994 by lead singer Dave Grohl. Foo Fighters has received thirty-five awards from one hundred-thirteen nominations.

Their most successful performance at any one ceremony over time, is that of the Grammys with 15 wins, while the Kerrang Awards in the United Kingdom is their most successful in terms of winning every time they have been nominated, with 6 wins from 6 nominations.

AltRock Awards

|-
|align="center" rowspan="2" | 2018 || Foo Fighters || Artist of the Year|| 
|-
| Dave Grohl || Best Male Singer || 
|-

American Music Awards
The American Music Awards is an annual award created by Dick Clark. The awards show is similar to the Grammy Awards and the MTV Video Music Awards.

BBC Music Awards

Billboard Music Awards

Brit Awards
The Brit Awards are awarded annually in the United Kingdom. As of 2018, Foo Fighters has received five awards from eight nominations.

GAFFA Awards

Denmark GAFFA Awards
Delivered since 1991, the GAFFA Awards are a Danish award that rewards popular music by the magazine of the same name.

!
|-
| 2002
| Foo Fighters
| Best Foreign Band
| 
| style="text-align:center;" rowspan="2"|
|-
| 2006
| In Your Honor
| Best Foreign Album
| 
|-
| 2007
| rowspan="2"| Foo Fighters
| rowspan="2"| Best Foreign Band
| 
| style="text-align:center;" |
|-
| 2018
| 
| style="text-align:center;" |
|-
|}

Sweden GAFFA Awards
Delivered since 2010, the GAFFA Awards (Swedish: GAFFA Priset) are a Swedish award that rewards popular music awarded by the magazine of the same name.

!
|-
| 2011
| Wasting Light
| Best Foreign Album
| 
| style="text-align:center;" |
|-
| rowspan="2"| 2018
| "Run"
| Best Foreign Song
| 
| style="text-align:center;" rowspan="2"|
|-
| Concrete and Gold
| Best Foreign Album
| 
|-
|}

Global Awards

Grammy Awards
The Grammy Awards are awarded annually by the National Academy of Recording Arts and Sciences in the United States. Foo Fighters has received fifteen awards from thirty-two nominations. They have won Best Rock Album five times, more than any other band.

Kerrang! Awards
The Kerrang! Awards is an award show from Kerrang! Magazine. Foo Fighters received six awards.

MTV Awards

MTV Australia Music Awards
The MTV Australia Music Awards is the Australian version of the MTV Video Music Awards. Foo Fighters received five nominations.

MTV Europe Music Awards
The MTV Europe Music Awards is an annuel award show from MTV Europe. Foo Fighters received eleven nominations.

MTV Video Music Awards
The MTV Video Music Awards were established in 1984 by MTV to celebrate the top music videos of the year. Foo Fighters has received three awards from twenty three nominations.

MTV Video Music Awards Japan
The MTV Video Music Awards Japan is the Japanese version of the MTV Video Music Awards. Foo Fighters were nominated three times.

NME Awards
The NME Awards is an annual award show from NME Magazine in the UK. Foo Fighters received five awards.

People's Choice Awards
The People's Choice Awards is an annual award show from CBS television. People vote for their favorite movies, TV shows, and music. Foo Fighters are nominated for one award.

Radio Music Awards
The Radio Music Awards is an annuel award show for the best radio music. Foo Fighters received three nominations.

Q Awards
The Q Awards is an annuel awards show from Q Magazine. Foo Fighters received two nominations.

Teen Choice Awards
The Teen Choice Awards is an annual award show which first aired in 1999 by Fox Broadcasting Company. Foo Fighters received five nominations.

UK Music Video Awards

The UK Music Video Awards is an annual award ceremony founded in 2008 to recognise creativity, technical excellence and innovation in music videos and moving images for music.

|-
| 2009
| Live at Wembley Stadium
| Best Live Music Coverage
|

References

Awards
Lists of awards received by American musician
Lists of awards received by musical group